The Spiez–Zweisimmen railway is a single-track standard-gauge line in Switzerland that is currently operated by BLS AG. It was formerly owned by the Spiez-Erlenbach-Zweisimmen-Bahn (SEZ), also called the Simmentalbahn (Simme Valley Railway). The line runs from  through the Simmental to Zweisimmen.
 
The SEZ was formed on 1 January 1942 from the merger of the Spiez-Erlenbach-Bahn (SEB), which opened the line from Spiez to Erlenbach on 16 August 1897, and the Erlenbach-Zweisimmen-Bahn (EZB), which opened the line from Erlenbach to Zweisimmen on 31 October 1902.
 

In June 1997, the SEZ merged with the Gürbetal-Bern-Schwarzenburg-Bahn (GBS), the Bern-Neuenburg-Bahn (BN) and the Berner Alpenbahn-Gesellschaft Bern–Lötschberg–Simplon (BLS) to form the BLS Lötschbergbahn, which itself merged with the Regionalverkehr Mittelland to form the BLS AG in 2006.
 
In Zweisimmen there is a connection to the narrow-gauge Montreux–Lenk im Simmental railway of the Montreux Oberland Bernois Railway (MOB), which runs from Lake Geneva to Lenk im Simmental. Local services operate hourly over the line. Regional Express services operate every two hours.

References 

Railway lines in Switzerland
Railway lines opened in 1897
1897 establishments in Switzerland